Kellas can refer to:
Kellas, Angus, Scotland.
Kellas, Moray, Scotland
Kellas Islands, Antarctica

See also
 Alexander Kellas (1868–1921), Scottish physiologist and mountaineer